Palpita viettei is a moth in the family Crambidae. It was described by Eugene G. Munroe in 1959. It is found on Guadeloupe in the Caribbean.

References

Moths described in 1959
Palpita
Moths of the Caribbean